Krásno is a town in Sokolov District in the Karlovy Vary Region of the Czech Republic. It has about 700 inhabitants.

Notable people
Johann Caspar Ferdinand Fischer (c.1656–1746), German composer
Joseph Labitzky (1802–1881), composer

Twin towns – sister cities

Krásno is twinned with:
 Bischofsgrün, Germany

References

Cities and towns in the Czech Republic
Populated places in Sokolov District